California Proposition 13 may refer to:
 1978 California Proposition 13, People's Initiative to Limit Property Taxation
 2010 California Proposition 13, Seismic Retrofitting
 2020 California Proposition 13, Public Preschool, K-12, and College Health and Safety Bond Act

See also
 California ballot proposition, a referendum or initiative submitted to the California electorate for a vote
 List of California ballot propositions